Karl Gustav Cassel (20 October 1866 – 14 January 1945) was a Swedish economist and professor of economics at Stockholm University.

Work
Cassel's perspective on economic reality, and especially on the role of interest, was rooted in British neoclassicism and in the nascent Swedish schools. He is perhaps best known through John Maynard Keynes's A Tract on Monetary Reform (1923), in which he raised the idea of purchasing power parity.

"Cassel was beyond doubt one of the outstanding figures in economic science during the inter-war period. His authority was second only to that of Lord Keynes, and his advice was eagerly sought on many occasions by his own Government and by foreign Governments."

He was also a founding member of the Swedish school of economics, along with Knut Wicksell and David Davidson. Cassel came to economics from mathematics. He earned an advanced degree in mathematics from Uppsala University and was made professor at Stockholm University during the late 1890s but went to Germany before the turn of the century to study economics, publishing papers spanning just under forty years.

Following the end of WWI Gustav Cassel was actively involved in discussions on possible ways of restoring the gold standard, which would automatically restore the system of fixed exchange rates among participating nations. The stability of exchange rates was widely believed to be crucial for restoring the international trade and for its further stable and balanced growth.  The question, which Gustav Cassel tried to answer in his works written in the context of those discussions, was how to determine the appropriate level at which exchange rates were to be fixed during the restoration of the system of fixed exchange rates.  His advice was to fix exchange rates at the level corresponding to the purchasing power parity, as he believed that this would prevent trade imbalances between trading nations.  PPP doctrine proposed by Cassel was not really a positive theory of exchange rate determination (as Cassel was perfectly aware of numerous factors that prevent exchange rates from stabilizing at PPP level if allowed to float), but rather a normative policy advice, formulated in the context of discussions on returning to the fixed exchange rates system. 

He also worked on the German reparations problem. He was a member of many committees dealing with matters of state in Sweden and devoted much labour to the creation of a better system of budget exposition and control (1905–21). He was one of the Swedish representatives at the International Chamber of Commerce meeting in London in 1921. He became a member of Svenska Vetenskapsakademien and correspondent for Sweden to the Royal Economic Society.

In addition to his books in Swedish, he published the following works in other languages: Das Recht auf den vollen Arbeitsertrag (1900), The Nature and Necessity of Interest (1903), Theoretische Sozialökonomie (1919). His Memorandum on the World's Monetary Problems, published by the League of Nations for the International Financial Conference in Brussels in 1920, attracted widespread attention.

Some of his notable students include Nobel Prize in Economics laureates Bertil Ohlin and Gunnar Myrdal, and the future Moderate Party leader Gösta Bagge.

Notes

External links

 

1866 births
1945 deaths
Uppsala University alumni
Academic staff of Stockholm University
Swedish economists
Monetary economists
Stockholm University alumni
Financial economists
Macroeconomists